Hollywood & Vine (formerly Hollywood & Vine Cafeteria of the Stars) is a restaurant located next to the 50's Prime Time Café in Disney's Hollywood Studios, one of the four main theme parks at Walt Disney World. This restaurant is one of only five restaurants in park that recommend or require advance reservations, the others being the Hollywood Brown Derby, Mama Melrose's Ristorante Italiano, the 50's Prime Time Café, and the Sci-Fi Dine-In Theater Restaurant. Both beer and wine are served at Hollywood & Vine. Hollywood & Vine is one of three restaurants in the park that offer early entry into the show Fantasmic! Prior to 1998, the restaurant was called Hollywood & Vine Cafeteria; "of the Stars" was added to the name that year in recognition of the restaurant's newly instituted star-themed character meals. In 2003, there were twenty character meals offered at Walt Disney World, during which actors portraying various Disney characters would interact with guests while they ate at the parks' restaurants, and Disney was in the process of increasing the presence of costumed characters in the parks at the time. Nonetheless, Minnie Mouse character meals held at Hollywood & Vine were discontinued that year, and Robert Johnson of the Orlando Sentinel partially attributed this cancellation to competition from the Sci-Fi Dine-In, which he said "almost always has a line of customers waiting." Hollywood & Vine had resumed its Minnie Mouse character meals by 2005. By 2012, the character meals had been changed to be Playhouse Disney-themed. By 2015, the Playhouse Disney characters had been switched out for Disney Junior characters. During Star Wars Weekends, the restaurant offers Jedi Mickey's Star Wars Dine, a character meal with Star Wars-themed decorations, music, and food.

References

Bibliography

Disney's Hollywood Studios
Walt Disney World restaurants
Restaurants established in 1989